

January 2011

Known erroneous reports
This section includes deaths which were initially reported as police killings but later turned out not to be.

See also

References

List of killings by law enforcement officers in the United States, 2011
2011 in American law
United States
 01
January 2011 events in the United States